This article lists airline mergers and acquisitions, with a brief history of each:

 Air India
2007 - Merged with Indian Airlines. Kept Air India name.

 Air Berlin
2006 - Acquired dba
2007 - Acquired LTU International
2009 - Acquired LGW
2009 - Acquired Belair
2011 - Acquired flyNiki
2017 - Filed for insolvency

 Air New Zealand
2000 - Acquired Ansett Australia, Ansett collapsed, proving to be more of a drain than asset.

 Air Canada
2000 - Acquired Canadian Airlines

 Air France
1990 - Acquired Air Inter, fully absorbing it into Air France in April, 1997.
2004 - Merged with KLM Royal Dutch Airlines, changing the company name to Air France KLM, although the two airlines still operate as separate airlines.

 Air Jamaica
2010 - Acquired by Caribbean Airlines

 Avianca
1919 - Begins as SCADTA
1940 - Merged with SACO, retains Avianca name
1994 - Merged with SAM and Helicol
2003 - Acquired ACES Colombia' routes
2003 - Acquired OceanAir and VIP Ecuador
2008 - Acquired Tampa Cargo
2009 - Merged with TACA Airlines
2009 - Acquired AeroGal
2014 - Acquired AeroUnion, which continues to operate as a separate airline

 Aurora 
2013 - Formed by merger of Aeroflot subsidiaries SAT Airlines and Vladivostok Air 

 Austrian Airlines
1957 Air Austria and Austrian Airways form Austrian Airlines
2002 Merged Rheintalflug and Tyrolean Airways to Austrian arrows
2013 Merged with Lauda Air kept name

 Bulgaria Air
2010 - Merged with Hemus Air kept the name Bulgaria Air

 Canadian Airlines
1987 - Formed by merger of Canadian Pacific Airlines, Eastern Provincial Airways, Nordair, and Pacific Western Airlines
1989 - Acquired Wardair
2001 - Canadian Airlines acquired by Air Canada

 Caribbean Airlines
2010 - Acquired Air Jamaica

Cathay Pacific
2006 - Acquired full ownership over Dragonair, which continues to operate as a separate airline (rebranded to Cathay Dragon in 2016).

 Cimber Air
2008 - Acquired bankrupt Sterling Airlines to form Cimber Sterling.

 KLM Royal Dutch Airlines
2004 - Acquired by Air France, which changed its company name to Air France KLM, although the two airlines still operate as separate airlines.

 Loftleidir-Icelandic
1979 - Flugfélag Íslands and Loftleiðir merged, and the airline became known as Icelandair.

 LOT Polish Airlines
1929 - Aero and Aerolot merged to form LOT Polish Airlines

 LAN Airlines
1995 - Purchased Ladeco
2012 - Merged with TAM Linhas Aéreas to form LATAM Airlines Group

Rossiya Airlines 
2006 - Increases by merger with Pulkovo Aviation Enterprise 
2016 - Increases by merger with Donavia and Orenair and re-brands

S7 Airlines (Siberia Airlines) 
2001 - Acquired Vnukovo Airlines and Baikal Airlines 
2004 - Acquired Enkor 
2005 - Re-brands from Siberia Airlines to S7 Airlines and makes Moscow-Domodedovo as the main hub 
2008 - Acquired Perm Airlines

 TAM Linhas Aéreas1996 - Acquired Helisul Linhas Aéreas
1996 - Acquired LAPSA
1998 - Acquired Itapemirim Transportes Aéreos
2012 - Merged with LAN Airlines to form LATAM Airlines Group

  United States AirTran Airways 1997 - Bought by the holding company for ValuJet Airlines, the holding company merged their ValuJet airline into AirTran thus keeping the AirTran name.
 2010 - Bought by Southwest Airlines, AirTran fleet transferred to Southwest and thereby AirTran becomes an inactive subsidiary.
 Alaska Airlines 1986 - Acquired Jet America Airlines
 1986 - Acquired Horizon Air, which continues to operate as a separate airline.
 2018 - Acquired Virgin America.  The merger made Alaska a dominant U.S. carrier in the West Coast.
 America West Airlines 2005 - Acquired US Airways
 American Airlines 1971 - Acquired Trans Caribbean Airways
 1987 - Acquired Air California
 1990 - Acquired the Eastern Air Lines' route network from Miami to Latin America and the Caribbean
 1997 - Acquired Reno Air
 2001 - Acquired Trans World Airlines
 2013 - Acquired US Airways.  Currently the world's largest carrier.
 2019 - Purchased a 3% stake in China Southern Airlines.
 Braniff International Airways 1982 -  South American routes was purchased by Eastern Air Lines
 Continental Airlines 1934 - Begins as Varney Speed Lines
 1982 - Acquired Texas International Airlines
 1987 - Acquired People Express, Frontier, and New York Air
 1987 - Acquired PBA and Britt Airways from People Express merger / created Continental Express
 2010 - Merged into United Airlines
 Delta Air Lines 1924 - Started as Huff Daland Dusters
 1928 - Huff Daland Dusters was purchased by C.E. Woolman and renamed Delta Air Service after the Mississippi Delta
 1953 - Purchased the Chicago and Southern Air Lines, and flew under the name Delta C&S for the next two years
 1972 - Purchased Northeast Airlines
 1984 - Established the Delta Connection (ASA, Comair, Skywest, ...)
 1987 - Merged with Western Airlines
 1991 - Purchase of Pan Am's European routes, and acquired Pan Am's shuttle, forming what is today Delta Shuttle
 1996 - Delta Express began service, ended November 2003
 2003 - Song began service, ended May 2006
 2010 - Merged with Northwest Airlines, was world's largest carrier at time of merger, keeping the Delta Air Lines brand.
 2017 - Bought 10% of Air France–KLM
 2017 - Bought 32% of Aeromexico to total a stake of 49% ownership
 2020 - Bought 20% of LATAM Airlines Group
 Eastern Air Lines 1956 - merges with Colonial Airlines
 1986 - Purchased by Texas International, but continues to operate separately as Eastern Airlines
 1990 - American Airlines purchased Eastern's routes from Miami to Latin America and the Caribbean
 Frontier Airlines 2007 - Entered service agreement with Republic Airways
 2008 - Declared bankruptcy, then purchased by Republic
 2009 - Still under the Frontier name, Republic mandates a merger between Frontier and Midwest Airlines
 2013 - Enter a contract with Indigo, beginning a transition into an ULCC
 Hughes Airwest 1968 -  Pacific Air Lines (originally Southwest Airways), Bonanza Air Lines, and West Coast Airlines merged to form Air West
 1970 - Howard Hughes purchased Air West and renamed it Hughes Airwest
 1980 - Merged into Republic Airlines
 National Airlines 1979 - Merged with Pan Am
 Northeast Airlines 1972 - Merged into Delta Air Lines
 Northwest Airlines 1916 - Founded by Col. Lewis Patenaude, under the name Northwest Airways
 1927 - Began flying passengers
 1949 - With its new routes to the far east, re-branded itself as Northwest Orient Airlines
 1986 - Purchased Republic Airlines, and dropped the word Orient from its brand name
 1993 - Began transatlantic partnership with KLM Royal Dutch Airlines, dubbed as "Worldwide Reliability".
 2008 - Merged into Delta Air Lines.  Became world's largest airline by passenger traffic in 2008 under the Delta name.
 Ozark Airlines 1943 - Ozark Air Lines is founded, then ceases operations in late 1940s
 1944 - Parks Air Transport (Parks Air Lines) is founded
 1950 - Ozark Air Lines resumes operations
 1950 - Purchased Parks Air Transport (Parks Air Lines)
 1986 - Merged into Trans World Airlines
  Pan Am 1928 - Merged with Aviation Corporation of the Americas/American International Airways
 1928 - Founded and formed by the merger of Atlantic, Gulf, and Caribbean Airways
 1929 - Acquired majority of Mexicana de Aviación
 1950 - Merged with American Overseas Airlines
 1979 - Merged with National Airlines
 1985 - United Airlines Purchased Pan Am's entire Pacific Division
 1990 - United Airlines Purchased Pan Am routes to London Heathrow Airport
 1991 - United Airlines Purchased Pan Am's entire Latin American Division
 1991 - Delta Air Lines purchased Pan Am's European routes, and acquired Pan Am's Shuttle
 Republic Airlines (Republic Airlines 1979-1986)
 1979 - Founded and formed by the merger of North Central Airlines and Southern Airways
 1944 - Southern Airways is founded
 1944 - Wisconsin Central Airlines is founded
 1952 - Wisconsin Central Airlines changes name to North Central Airlines
 1980 - Acquired Hughes Airwest
 1986 - Merged into Northwest Orient to form Northwest Airlines
 Republic Airways Holdings 2005 - Acquired Shuttle America.
 2009 - Acquired Midwest Airlines.
 2009 - Acquired Frontier Airlines.
 Southwest Airlines 1985 - Acquired Muse Air
 1993 - Acquired Morris Air
 2008 - Acquired certain assets of bankrupt ATA Airlines
 2010 - Acquired AirTran Airways
 Trans World Airlines 1925 - First Incorporate as Western Air Express 
 1927 - Maddux Air Lines is founded
 1927 - Standard Air Lines is founded
 1928 - Transcontinental Air Transport is founded
 1929 - Maddux Air Lines merges with Transcontinental Air Transport 
 1930 - Standard Air Lines merges with Western Air Express
 1930 - Western Air Express merges with Transcontinental Air Transport, rebranded itself as Transcontinental & Western Air, T&WA, later changed name to Trans World Airlines, TWA 
 1934 - Western Air Express broke off from Transcontinental & Western Air, T&WA and briefly changed its name to General Air Lines, returning to the name Western Air Express after several months
 1986 - Purchased Ozark Air Lines
 2001 - Merged into American Airlines
 United Airlines 1926 - Founded as Varney Air Lines
 1931 - Purchased National Air Transport and Pacific Air Transport
 1961 - Merged with Capital Airlines
 1985 - Purchased Pan Am's entire Pacific Division
 1990 - Purchased Pan Am routes to London Heathrow Airport
 1991 - Purchased Pan Am's entire Latin American Division
 2012 - Acquired Continental Airlines.  Was the world's largest carrier at the time of merger.
 2014 - After taking over Continental, United closed the hub at Cleveland Hopkins International Airport for the second time.
 US Airways 1938 - Started as All American Aviation Company, renamed All American Airlines and then Allegheny Airlines
 1957 - Changed name to Allegheny Airlines
 1968 - Purchased Lake Central Airlines 
 1972 - Purchased Mohawk Airlines
 1979 - Changed name to USAir
 1988 - Purchased Pacific Southwest Airlines 
 1989 - Purchased Piedmont Airlines
 1992 - Operates former Trump Shuttle for banks, renamed by banks as Shuttle, Inc, dba USAir Shuttle
 1997 - Changed name to US Airways
 1997 - Purchased former Trump Shuttle, now Shuttle, Inc from Banks, dba US Airways Shuttle
 1998 - Launches low-fare carrier MetroJet
 2000 - Merges US Airways Shuttle into US Airways
 2001 - Dissolves low-fare carrier MetroJet 
 2005 - Acquired America West Airlines
 2013 - Merged into American Airlines
 Virgin America 2016 - Merged into Alaska Airlines.  The merger made Alaska a dominant U.S. carrier in the West Coast.
 Western Airlines 1925 - First incorporated as Western Air Express by Harris Hanshue
 1926 - Western's first flight took place
 1928 - Reincorporated as Western Air Express Corp.
 1930 - Purchased Standard Airlines (subsidiary of Aero Corp. of Ca. founded in 1926). WAE with Fokker aircraft merged with Transcontinental Air Transport T-A-T to form Transcontinental & Western Air T&WA.
 1934 - Western Air Express broke off from Transcontinental & Western Air T&WA and briefly changed its name to General Air Lines, returning to the name Western Air Express after several months
 1941 - Western Air Express changed its name to Western Air Lines, which was later altered to Western Airlines
 1967 - merged with Pacific Northern Airlines
 1987 - Merged into Delta Air Lines

 Lufthansa1955 - Created Deutsche Flugdienst GmbH in conjunction with other companies and subsequently owned 25.81% of it
1959 - Increased its shares in Deutsche Flugdienst to 95.5%. In 1961 Deutsche Flugdienst bought "Condor-Luftreederei“ renaming itself then "Condor Flugdienst GmbH"
1989 - Created SunExpress Airlines as a joint venture with Turkish Airlines
1995 - Transferred SunExpress shares over to Condor
1999 - Purchased 26% of Air Dolomiti
2003 - upped its stake to 51.9% (April) and then 100% (November) of Air Dolomiti 
2006 - Lufthansa sold its remaining 50% stake in Condor to KarstadtQuelle AG 
2007 - In conjunction with the sale of Condor, LH took back its shares of SunExpress
2005-2007 - Purchased Swiss Int'l Airlines
2008 - Purchased Austrian Airlines
2008 - Purchased BMI (Sold in 2011 to IAG (British Airways))
2008 - Acquired 45% of Brussels Airlines
2008 - Purchased 19% of Jetblue
2009 - Acquired 100% of Germanwings
2016 - Acquired remaining 55% of Brussels Airlines
2017 - Acquired Air Berlin

 British Airways and Iberia'''
 2010 - International Airlines Group was formed by the merger of two airlines. Both carriers continued to operate under separate brand.

See also 
List of airline holding companies - the actual enterprises and business entities which do the acquisitions and mergers.

References

Mergers
Airline mergers
Merger